Bishwoshundori is a 2020 Bangladeshi romantic drama film. It is director Chayanika Chowdhury's debut film. The film stars Siam Ahmed, Pori Moni, Champa, Fazlur Rahman Babu & Alamgir. The film is produced by Sun Music & Motion Pictures Limited and distributed by Jaaz Multimedia. Masranga Television is the broadcast partner & owns the TV rights. The soundtracks of the film are composed by Imran, Pritom Hasan, Kona, Farid Ahmed and Pintu Ghosh.

The film premiered in theatres on 11 December 2020. It was scheduled to release on 27 March 2020, in occasion of Independence Day of Bangladesh, but the release was postponed due to COVID-19 pandemic.

Cast 
 Siam Ahmed as Shadhin
 Pori Moni as Shova 
 Alamgir
 Fazlur Rahman Babu
 Champa
 Monira Mithu

Soundtrack

References  

2020 films
Bengali-language Bangladeshi films
Films postponed due to the COVID-19 pandemic
Best Film National Film Award (Bangladesh) winners